Creo en mis raíces is a sculpture by Camilo Ramírez, installed in Tlaquepaque, in the Mexican state of Jalisco.

References

External links

 

Outdoor sculptures in Jalisco
Sculptures of men in Mexico
Sculptures of women in Mexico
Statues in Jalisco
Tlaquepaque